Mexicana Universal Puebla is a pageant in Puebla, Mexico, that selects that state's representative for the national Mexicana Universal pageant.

The State Organization has produced two Nuestra Belleza Mundo México titleholder in 2002 with Blanca Zumárraga and  2005 with Karla Jiménez.

Mexicana Universal Puebla winners have gone on to win Nuestra Belleza México twice.

Titleholders
Below are the names of the annual titleholders of Nuestra Belleza Puebla 1994–2016, Mexicana Universal Puebla 2017–2022, and their final placements in the Mexicana Universal.

 Competed in Miss Universe.
 Competed in Miss World.
 Competed in Miss International.
 Competed in Miss Charm International.
 Competed in Miss Continente Americano.
 Competed in Reina Hispanoamericana.
 Competed in Miss Orb International.
 Competed in Nuestra Latinoamericana Universal.

Designated Contestants
As of 2000, it is not uncommon for some States to have more than one delegate competing simultaneously in the national pageant. The following Nuestra Belleza Puebla contestants were invited to compete in Nuestra Belleza México.

External links
Official Website

Puebla
Nuestra Belleza